The Nvidia Quadro Plex is an external graphics processing unit (Visual Computing System) designed for large-scale 3D visualizations. The system consists of a box containing a pair of high-end Nvidia Quadro graphics cards featuring a variety of external video connectors. A special PCI Express card is installed in the host computer, and the two are connected by VHDCI cables.

Specifications 
The Nvidia Quadro Plex system supports up to four GPUs per unit. It connects to the host PC via a small form factor PCI Express card connected to the host, and a  Nvidia Quadro Plex Interconnect Cable. The system is housed in an external case that is approximately 9.49 inches in height, 5.94 inches in width, and 20.55 inches in depth and weighs about 19 pounds. The system relies heavily on Nvidia's SLI technology.

Targeted audiences 

The Plex is aimed at large CGI animation companies, such as Pixar and DreamWorks Animation. This product is one of several professional graphics solutions on the market today, along with ATI's FireGL and Matrox's professional graphics cards.

See also
 Sun Visualization System - uses Nvidia Quadro Plex for 3D rendering and graphics acceleration
  SGI Virtu VS product line - supports Quadro Plex

External links 
Nvidia.com Quadro Plex VCS
Quadro Plex Comparison Chart
RTX 3090 - NVIDIA GeForce Graphics

Third party information on the Quadro Plex:
Gizmodo: Nvidia Announces Quadro Plex, Monster Graphics for Pros

Graphics hardware
Quadro Plex
Visual effects
Multi-monitor